The Leitrim Junior A Football Championship is an annual football competition often contested by lower-tier or 2nd team Leitrim GAA clubs and is the counties third tier of football championship. The 2021 Junior A Champions of Leitrim were Mohill.

Junior A Championship

Wins listed by club

Junior Gaelic football county championships
Leitrim GAA club championships